Ernestus "Ernst" Johannes Christiaan Greven (September 8, 1885 – March 8, 1924) was a Dutch athlete, who competed at the 1908 Summer Olympics in London. Born in The Hague, he died at age 38 in Zoppot near Danzig in Poland.

In the 100 metres, Greven placed fifth (last) in his first round heat to be eliminated from competition.  He also placed last in his preliminary heat of the 200 metres, taking third in the three-man heat.

References

Sources
 
 
 

1885 births
1924 deaths
Dutch male sprinters
Olympic athletes of the Netherlands
Athletes (track and field) at the 1908 Summer Olympics
Sportspeople from The Hague
People from Sopot